The  is the largest peninsula on the island of Honshū in Japan. It is named after the ancient Kii Province.

Overview 

The area south of the “Central Tectonic Line” is called , and is home to reef-like coral communities which are amongst the northernmost in the world (apart from cold-water corals) due to the presence of the warm Kuroshio Current, though these are threatened by global warming  and human interference.

Most of the Kii Peninsula is dense temperate rainforest since the climate even in the very limited lowlands is too wet for agriculture, and much of the coast consists of networks of small rias into which flow very steep and rapid streams characterised by numerous high waterfalls. Forestry and fishing were the traditional economic mainstays of the region and remain important even today despite a declining population and labour force.

Location
Wakayama Prefecture occupies much of the area, including the entire southern part. To the northwest of Wakayama Prefecture is Osaka Prefecture, whose southern part is on the peninsula. East of Osaka Prefecture is landlocked Nara Prefecture; farther east is Mie Prefecture.

The Seto Inland Sea lies to the west of the Kii Peninsula. To the south and east is the Pacific Ocean and to the north is the valley of the Kiso Three Rivers and Ise Bay.

Notable places
Notable places in the Kii Peninsula include :
 Nara, former capital of Japan.
 Mount Kōya (or Kōyasan), the headquarters of the Shingon sect of Buddhism.
 Wakayama, former home of the Kii (or Kishu) Tokugawa clan. It is the location of the Hinokuma Shrine, which is affiliated to the Grand Shrine of Ise.
 Matsuzaka, now the center of a major beef-producing area, formerly the center of Ise merchants.
 Ise, the location of the Grand Shrine of Ise and center of pearl production.
 Yoshino District, a wild area of heavily forested deep mountains, home of the Southern Imperial Court during the Nanboku-chō period of Japanese history.
 Kumano Region, home of the Kumano Shrines and the Nachi Waterfall. Another name is Muro District.
 Kushimoto, Wakayama, the southernmost point in Honshū.
 Taiji, Wakayama, the birthplace of the Japanese traditional whaling.

The Kii Peninsula is the location of a UNESCO World Heritage Site: Sacred Sites and Pilgrimage Routes in the Kii Mountain Range.

In 2004, UNESCO designated three other locations on the Kii Peninsula as World Heritage Sites. They are:

Yoshino and Mount Omine, mountainous areas in the north of the peninsula.
Kumano Shrines, three shrines at the southern tip of the peninsula.
Mount Kōya, the mountain at the west of the peninsula

Transportation
 Nanki-Shirahama Airport in Shirahama serves the southern part of the Kii Peninsula.
 The Kisei Main Line connects Wakayama to Mie Prefecture and runs along the peninsula's coastline.

Notes

External links

 Visit Wakayama
 Tanabe City Kumano Tourism Bureau

Peninsulas of Japan
Landforms of Wakayama Prefecture
Landforms of Mie Prefecture
Landforms of Nara Prefecture